Dracaenura arfakalis is a moth in the family Crambidae. It was described by Charles Swinhoe in 1918. It is found on New Guinea.

References

Moths described in 1918
Spilomelinae